Gerard James Farrell (born 14 June 1975) was a Scottish footballer who played for Dumbarton, Dunfermline Athletic, Ross County, Airdrie, Alloa Athletic, Clydebank, Forfar Athletic and Berwick Rangers.

References

1975 births
Scottish footballers
Dumbarton F.C. players
Clydebank F.C. (1965) players
Ross County F.C. players
Berwick Rangers F.C. players
Airdrieonians F.C. (1878) players
Dunfermline Athletic F.C. players
Alloa Athletic F.C. players
Forfar Athletic F.C. players
Scottish Football League players
Living people
Association football midfielders